"I Missed the Shock" is the 22nd single by Japanese entertainer Akina Nakamori. Written by Qumico Fucci, the single was released on November 1, 1988, by Warner Pioneer through the Reprise label. It was also the sixth single from her fourth compilation album Best II.

Background 
It was arranged by the band Eurox, who were involved in Nakamori's 1988 album Fushigi. On live performances of the song, Nakamori wore a costume that she found on an Isetan department store magazine advertisement. Costume designer Mariko Koga was initially reluctant to provide it to Nakamori, but she saw Nakamori's enthusiasm and gave it to her. The costume was featured in Nakamori's Femme Fatale tour in 1989.

Nakamori also performed the song on the 39th Kōhaku Uta Gassen, making her sixth appearance on NHK's New Year's Eve special. She would not appear on the special again until 2002.

Chart performance 
"I Missed the Shock" peaked at No. 3 on Oricon's weekly singles chart and sold over 311,200 copies, ending a streak of 16 No. 1 singles from 1984 to 1988.

Track listing

Charts

References

External links 
 
 
 

1988 singles
1988 songs
Akina Nakamori songs
Japanese-language songs
Warner Music Japan singles
Reprise Records singles